The 1983–84 Yugoslav Cup was the 36th season of the top football knockout competition in SFR Yugoslavia, the Yugoslav Cup, also known as the "Marshal Tito Cup" (Kup Maršala Tita), since its establishment in 1946.

Calendar

First round proper

Second round proper

Quarterfinals

Semifinals

Final

Summary
The 1984 Yugoslav Cup Final was contested by Hajduk Split and Red Star over two legs, played at the Poljud Stadium in Split and the Red Star Stadium in Belgrade. Hajduk Split won 2–1 on aggregate, winning the first leg in Split with goals from Blaž Slišković and Zoran Vulić, while the second leg in Belgrade ended in a goalless draw.

Hajduk had reached the final ten times previously, winning six titles (1967, 1972, 1973, 1974, 1976, 1977). It was their first silverware in five years after their 1978–79 Yugoslav First League win.

First leg

Second leg

See also
1983–84 Yugoslav First League
1983–84 Yugoslav Second League

External links
1983–84 cup season details at Rec.Sport.Soccer Statistics Foundation
1984 cup final details at Rec.Sport.Soccer Statistics Foundation

Yugoslav Cup seasons
Cup
Yugo